Ljubomir Mihajlovski (born 1954 in Skopje), is the minister of internal affairs of the Republic of Macedonia since December 2004. He graduated in law in 1980. He has had several posts in the ministry, including Deputy Assistant Minister of Criminal Police. He was Director general of the customs.

External links
Biographical information about Mihajlovski on the site of the Macedonian government

1954 births
Living people
Politicians from Skopje
Social Democratic Union of Macedonia politicians